"Daggers" is the first episode of seaQuest DSV`s second season. It was originally shown on September 18, 1994, and originally aired as a two-hour television movie.

The episode introduces a plethora of new elements into the canon of seaQuest DSV, such as new characters like Seaman Lonnie Henderson, Lieutenant James Brody, Seaman Tony Piccolo, Dr. Wendy Smith, and Dagwood. This episode was also the first seaQuest DSV episode filmed in Florida after production had changed locations from Los Angeles from the previous season, and the change in direction, having more of a sci fi/fantasy style to the episodes.

Quick Overview: The new seaQuest DSV 4600 shoves off from New Cape Quest in Florida, bound for a parade in New York City, however, the shakedown cruise is soon interrupted when Genetically Engineered Life Forms (G.E.L.F.s or "Daggers") revolt and seize control of their UEO colony. The GELFs then infiltrate the main headquarters complex of the entire UEO with a speedboat and two small, motorized inflatable rafts.

Plot 
Lieutenant James Brody speeds along the ocean surface bound for the G.E.L.F. Colony (also known as "Dagger Island"), returning from a well-deserved vacation. As he arrives, he notices the G.E.L.F. prisoners engaging in their daily exercise in the main yard.

Captain Nathan Bridger speeds along the city streets on his way to the drydock where the new seaQuest DSV 4600 submarine awaits orders to shove off and roam the seven seas.

As Brody sends out a distress signal to anyone who might be listening, Captain Bridger is introduced to his new chief medical officer, Dr. Wendy Smith.

the crew picks up on Brody's distress call and rescues the lieutenant from the pod.

Ford believes that it was for a higher good, but Brody claims it does not matter, but reveals that Captain Bridger has asked him to sign onto seaQuest to ensure something similar will not happen again.

Background

In its original airing, the episode contains a glaring continuity error; just prior to the GELF invasion of UEO Headquarters, an establishing shot of the complex is shown on screen with the seaQuest still in port (the shot having been recycled from earlier in episode), despite the fact that the seaQuest is established as being located just off of the GELF colony island. When this episode was later split into two-parts for reruns and syndication, the error was corrected with the seaQuest CGI being removed from the shot.

General Thomas makes reference to the Secretary General of the UEO (a position last held by Admiral Noyce as recently as "Higher Power", but, not explicitly by name. In The Fear That Follows, McGath would make his first appearance, though, not identified by name, and not established as being the Secretary General until "The Sincerest Form of Flattery".

The seaQuest cap that Captain Bridger gives to Dagwood would later be seen in Dagwood's "quarters" (actually, just his small compartment at the end of a corridor) in "The Siamese Dream".

Mariah would later appear in "Dagger Redux".

The flirtation between O'Neill and Henderson would later be followed up on in "Vapors".

The end credits feature the last time the original seaQuest DSV theme song would be used in the series. The second season would use a shortened version of the original theme and would be replaced entirely by the third season. Unlike the rest of the season, there are no "seaQuest Sea Facts" presented in this episode.

References 

SeaQuest DSV episodes
American television films
1994 American television episodes